The Anabantiformes , collectively known as  Labyrinth fish.  are an order of air-breathing freshwater ray-finned fish with two suborders, five families (Channidae, Aenigmachannidae, Anabantidae, Helostomatidae, and Osphronemidae) and having at least 207 species. In addition, some authorities expand the order to include the suborder Nandoidei, which includes three families - the Nandidae, Badidae and Pristolepididae - that appear to be closely related to the Anabantiformes. The order, and these three related families (classified as incertae sedis by the 5th edition of Fishes of the World), are part of a monophyletic clade which is a sister clade to the Ovalentaria, the other orders in the clade being Synbranchiformes, Carangiformes, Istiophoriformes and Pleuronectiformes. This clade is sometimes referred to as the Carangaria but is left unnamed and unranked in Fishes of the World. This group of fish are found in Asia and Africa, with some species introduced in United States of America.

These fish are characterized by the presence of teeth on the parasphenoid. The snakeheads and the anabantoids are united by the presence of the labyrinth organ, which is a highly folded suprabranchial accessory breathing organ. It is formed by vascularized expansion of the epibranchial bone of the first gill arch and used for respiration in air.

Many species are popular as aquarium fish - the most notable are the Siamese fighting fish and several species of gouramies. In addition to being aquarium fish, some of the larger anabantiforms (such as the giant gourami) are also harvested for food in their native countries.

Taxonomy
There are two suborders and five families currently recognized within the order Anabantiformes:

 suborder Anabantoidei Berg, 1940
 family Anabantidae Bonaparte, 1831
 Anabas (Cloquet, 1816)
 Ctenopoma (Peters, 1844)
 Microctenopoma (Norris, 1995)
 Sandelia (Castelnau, 1861)
 family Helostomatidae Gill, 1872
 Helostoma (Cuvier, 1829)
 family Osphronemidae van der Hoeven, 1832
 Subfamily Belontiinae (Liem, 1962)
 Belontia (Myers, 1923)
 Subfamily Osphroneminae (van der Hoeven, 1832)
 Osphronemus (Lacepède, 1801)
 Subfamily Luciocephalinae (Bleeker, 1852)
 Luciocephalus (Bleeker, 1851)
 Sphaerichthys (Canestrini, 1860)
 Ctenops (McClelland, 1845)
 Parasphaerichthys (Prashad & Mukerji, 1929)
 Subfamily Macropodusinae (Hoedeman, 1948)
 Trichogaster (Bloch & Schneider, 1801)
 Trichopodus (Lacepède, 1801)
 Betta (Bleeker, 1850)
 Parosphromenus (Bleeker, 1877)
 Macropodus (Lacepède, 1801)
 Malpulutta (Deraniyagala, 1937)
 Pseudosphromenus (Bleeker, 1879)
 Trichopsis (Canestrini, 1860)
 suborder Channoidei Berg, 1940
 family Aenigmachannidae Britz et al., 2020
 Aenigmachanna (Britz, Anoop, Dahanukar and Raghavan, 2019)
 family Channidae Fowler, 1934
Parachanna (Teugels & Daget, 1984)
Channa (Scopoli, 1777)

Alternative systematics

Phylogeny
Below shows the phylogenetic relationships among the Anabantiform families after Collins et al. (2015), here including the Nandoidei as Anabantiforms:

References